This is a timeline of country and capital changes around the world since 2000. It includes dates of declarations of independence, changes in country name, changes of capital city or name, and changes in territory such as the annexation, cession, concession, occupation, or secession of land. Territorial conquests as a result of war are included on the timeline at the conclusion of military campaigns, but changes in the course of specific battles and day-to-day operations are generally not included. Changes in airspace and maritime territory are included only when they are subject to a dispute.

2000s

2010s

2020s

See also

Notes

References

21st-century timelines
Geography-related lists
Geopolitics
History-related lists
Maps